Carl "Duke" Iverson is a former American football coach born in 1940.  He served as the head football coach at Black Hills State University from 1983 to 1984, Western Oregon University from 1985 to 1987 and again from 2001 to 2004, and Western State College of Colorado—now known as Western Colorado University—from 1988 to 1995 and again from 1997 to 2000, compiling a career college football coaching record of 126–85–3. Prior to his retirement in 2008, Iverson returned to Western State Colorado for two seasons as offensive coordinator.

Iverson graduated from tiny Pe Ell High School 
before earning his B.A. in chemistry from Whitman College in 1962 and his Ph.D. in biological science from the University of Wisconsin in 1967 before beginning his career in coaching. In the fall of 1967 he accepted a position as an assistant coach at Western State College of Colorado, which launched his successful career.

Head coaching record

College

References

Black Hills State Yellow Jackets football coaches
Western Oregon Wolves football coaches
Western Colorado Mountaineers football coaches
Whitman Fighting Missionaries football players